A list of films released in Japan in 1955 (see 1955 in film).

See also
1955 in Japan

References

Bibliography

External links
Japanese films of 1955 at the Internet Movie Database

1955
Lists of 1955 films by country or language
Films